The volleyball competition at the 2018 Central American and Caribbean Games was held in Barranquilla, Colombia at the Humberto Perea Coliseum. The women's tournament was held from the 20 to 25 July, whilst the men's tournament was held from the 28 July to 2 August.

Medal summary

Medalists

Medal table

Men's tournament

Qualification

Pools composition

Pool standing procedure
 Number of matches won
 Match points
 Points ratio
 Sets ratio
 Result of the last match between the tied teams

Match won 3–0: 5 match points for the winner, 0 match points for the loser
Match won 3–1: 4 match points for the winner, 1 match point for the loser
Match won 3–2: 3 match points for the winner, 2 match points for the loser

Preliminary round
All times are local (UTC–5).

Pool A

Pool B

Final round

Bracket

Quarterfinals

5–8th place semifinals

7th place match

5th place match

Semifinals

Third place match

Final

Final standings

Individual awards

Most Valuable Player

Best Scorer

Best Setter

Best Outside Hitters

Best Opposite

Best Server

Best Middle Blockers

Best Libero

Best Digger

Best Receiver

Women's tournament

Qualification

Pools composition

Preliminary round
All times are local (UTC–5).

Pool A

Pool B

Final round

Bracket

Quarterfinals

5–8th place semifinals

7th place match

5th place match

Semifinals

Third place match

Final

Final standings

Individual awards

Most Valuable Player

Best Scorer

Best Setter

Best Outside Hitters

Best Opposite

Best Server

Best Middle Blockers

Best Libero

Best Digger

Best Receiver

References

External links
2018 Central American and Caribbean Games – Volleyball

2018 Central American and Caribbean Games events
Central American and Caribbean Games
2018
Central American and Caribbean Games